In music theory, a leading-tone (also called a subsemitone, and a leading-note in the UK) is a note or pitch which resolves or "leads" to a note one semitone higher or lower, being a lower and upper leading-tone, respectively. Typically, the leading tone refers to the seventh scale degree of a major scale, a major seventh above the tonic. In the movable do solfège system, the leading-tone is sung as ti.

A leading-tone triad is a triad built on the seventh scale degree in a major key (vii in Roman numeral analysis), while a leading-tone seventh chord is a seventh chord built on the seventh scale degree (vii7). Walter Piston considers and notates vii as V, an incomplete dominant seventh chord. (For the Roman numeral notation of these chords, see Roman numeral analysis.)

Note

Seventh scale degree (or lower leading tone) 
Typically, when people speak of the leading tone, they mean the seventh scale degree of the major scale, which has a strong affinity for and leads melodically to the tonic. It is sung as ti in movable-do solfège. For example, in the C major scale, the leading note is the note B.

 

As a diatonic function, the leading tone is the seventh scale degree of any diatonic scale when the distance between it and the tonic is a single semitone. In diatonic scales in which there is a whole tone between the seventh scale degree and the tonic, such as the Mixolydian mode, the seventh degree is called the subtonic. However, in modes without a leading tone, such as Dorian and Mixolydian, a raised seventh is often featured during cadences, such as in the harmonic minor scale.

A leading tone outside of the current scale is called a secondary leading-tone, leading to a secondary tonic. It functions to briefly tonicize a scale tone (usually the 5th degree) as part of a secondary dominant chord. In the second measure of Beethoven's Waldstein Sonata (shown below), the F's function as secondary leading-tones, which resolve to G in the next measure.

Descending, or upper, leading-tone

By contrast, a descending, or upper, leading-tone is a leading tone that resolves down, as opposed to the seventh scale degree (a lower leading-tone) which resolves up. The descending, or upper, leading-tone usually is a lowered second degree resolving to the tonic, but the expression may at times refer to a  resolving to the dominant. In German, the term Gegenleitton ("counter leading tone") is used by Hugo Riemann to denote the descending or upper leading-tone, but Heinrich Schenker uses abwärtssteigenden Leitton ("descending leading tone") to mean the descending diatonic supertonic.)

The tritone substitution, chord progression ii-subV-I on C (Dm-Db7-C), results in an upper leading-note.

Analysis 
According to Ernst Kurth, the major and minor thirds contain "latent" tendencies towards the perfect fourth and whole tone, respectively, and thus establish tonality. However, Carl Dahlhaus contests Kurth's position, holding that this drive is in fact created through or with harmonic function, a root progression in another voice by a whole-tone or fifth, or melodically (monophonically) by the context of the scale. For example, the leading tone of alternating C chord and F minor chords is either the note E leading to F (if F is tonic), or A leading to G (if C is tonic).

In works from the 14th- and 15th-century Western tradition, the leading tone is created by the progression from imperfect to perfect consonances, such as a major third to a perfect fifth or minor third to a unison. The same pitch outside of the imperfect consonance is not a leading tone.

Forte claims that the leading tone is only one example of a more general tendency: the strongest progressions, melodic and harmonic, are by half step. He suggests that one play a G major scale and stop on the seventh note (F) to personally experience the feeling of lack caused by the "particularly strong attraction" of the seventh note to the eighth (F→G'), thus its name.

Leading-tone triad
A leading-tone chord is a triad built on the seventh scale degree in major and the raised seventh-scale-degree in minor. The quality of the leading-tone triad is diminished in both major and minor keys. For example, in both C major and C minor, it is a B diminished triad (though it is usually written in first inversion, as described below).

According to John Bunyan Herbert, (who uses the term "subtonic", which later came to usually refer to a seventh scale degree pitched a whole tone below the tonic note),

Function 
The leading-tone triad is used in several functions. It is commonly used as a passing chord between a root position tonic triad and a first inversion tonic triad: that is, "In addition to its basic function of passing between I and I, VII has another important function: it can form a neighboring chord to I or I." In that instance, the leading-tone triad prolongs tonic through neighbor and passing motion. The example below shows two measures from the fourth movement of Beethoven's Piano Sonata No. 3 in C major, Op. 2 in which a leading-tone triad functions as a passing chord between I and I.

The leading-tone triad may also be regarded as an incomplete dominant seventh chord: "A chord is called 'Incomplete' when its root is omitted. This omission occurs, occasionally, in the chord of the dom.-seventh, and the result is a triad upon the leading-tone."

Some sources say the chord is not a chord; some argue it is an incomplete dominant seventh chord, especially when the diminished triad is written in its first inversion (resembling a second inversion dominant seventh without a root):

For example, vii often substitutes for V, which it closely resembles, and its use may be required in situations by voice leading: "In a strict four-voice texture, if the bass is doubled by the soprano, the VII [vii] is required as a substitute for the V".

Voice-leading 
Since the leading-tone triad is a diminished triad, it is usually found in its first inversion: According to Carl Edward Gardner, "The first inversion of the triad is considered, by many, preferable to root position. The second inversion of the triad is unusual. Some theorists forbid its use."

In a four-part chorale texture, the third of the leading-tone triad is doubled in order to avoid adding emphasis on the tritone created by the root and the fifth. Unlike a dominant chord where the leading-tone can be frustrated and not resolve to the tonic if it is in an inner voice, the leading-tone in a leading-tone triad must resolve to the tonic. Commonly, the fifth of the triad resolves down since it is phenomenologically similar to the seventh in a dominant seventh chord. All in all, the tritone resolves inward if it is written as a diminished fifth (m. 1 below) and outward if it is written as an augmented fourth (m. 2).

Leading-tone seventh chord 

The leading-tone seventh chords are vii7 and vii7, the half-diminished and diminished seventh chords on the seventh scale degree of the major and harmonic minor. For example, in C major and C minor, the leading-tone seventh chords are B half-diminished (B-D-F-A) and B diminished (B-D-F-A), respectively.

Leading-tone seventh chords were not characteristic of Renaissance music but are typical of the Baroque and Classical period. They are used more freely in Romantic music but began to be used less in classical music as conventions of tonality broke down. They are integral to ragtime and contemporary popular and jazz music genres.

Composers throughout the common practice period often employed modal mixture when using the leading-tone seventh chord in a major key, allowing for the substitution of the half-diminished seventh chord with the fully diminished seventh chord (by lowering its seventh). This mixture is commonly used when the leading-tone seventh chord is functioning as a secondary leading-tone chord.

The example below shows fully diminished seventh chords in the key of D major in the right hand in the third movement of Mozart's Piano Sonata No. 5 in G major.

Function 
The leading-tone seventh chord has a dominant function and may be used in place of V or V. Just as vii is sometimes considered an incomplete dominant seventh chord, a leading-tone seventh chord is often considered a "dominant ninth chord without root".)

 

For variety, leading-tone seventh chords are frequently substituted for dominant chords, with which they have three common tones: "The seventh chord founded upon the subtonic [in major]... is occasionally used. It resolves directly to the tonic... This chord may be employed without preparation."

Voice-leading 
In contrast to leading-tone triads, leading-tone seventh chords appear in root position. The example below shows leading-tone seventh chords (in root position) functioning as dominants in a reduction of Mozart's Don Giovanni, K. 527, act 1, scene 13.

François-Joseph Fétis tunes the leading-tone seventh in major 5:6:7:9.

See also 
Musica ficta

References

Sources

Further reading
 
Stainer, John, and William Alexander Barrett (eds.) (1876). A Dictionary of Musical Terms. London: Novello, Ewer and Co. New and revised edition, London: Novello & Co, 1898.

Diatonic functions
7.5